Clwyd South is a constituency of the House of Commons of the Parliament of the United Kingdom (Westminster). The constituency was created in 1997, and it elects one Member of Parliament (MP) by the first past the post method of election.

The Clwyd South Senedd constituency was created with the same boundaries in 1999 (as an Assembly constituency).

Boundaries

The constituency straddles the authorities of Denbighshire and the borough of Wrexham. Main population centres includes the suburbs of Ruabon, Chirk, Rhosllannerchrugog, Cefn Mawr and Coedpoeth to the south of the city of Wrexham, in addition to Llangollen and Corwen further up the Dee valley to the west. Until the 2010 election, the constituency used to include a small part of the preserved county of Powys. This anomaly was resolved by the Boundary Commission for Wales with the boundaries first used in 2010.

The constituency comprises the following electoral wards:

From Wrexham: 	Overton, Bronington, Dyffryn Ceiriog/Ceiriog Valley, Chirk North, Gwenfro, Johnstown, Llangollen Rural, Marchwiel, Penycae, Penycae and Ruabon South, Plas Madoc, Ponciau, Ruabon, Bryn Cefn, Minera, Brymbo, Coedpoeth, Cefn, Chirk South, Esclusham, New Broughton, Pant
From Denbighshire: Corwen, Llangollen, Llandrillo

Members of Parliament

Elections

Elections in the 1990s
:

Elections in the 2000s

Of the 298 rejected ballots:
273 were either unmarked or it was uncertain who the vote was for.
16 voted for more than one candidate.
8 had writing or mark by which the voter could be identified.
1 had want of official mark.

Elections in the 2010s

Of the 55 rejected ballots:
39 were either unmarked or it was uncertain who the vote was for.
15 voted for more than one candidate.
1 had writing or mark by which the voter could be identified.

Of the 56 rejected ballots:
38 were either unmarked or it was uncertain who the vote was for.
18 voted for more than one candidate.

Of the 110 rejected ballots:
92 were either unmarked or it was uncertain who the vote was for.
18 voted for more than one candidate.

See also
 Clwyd South (Senedd constituency)
 List of parliamentary constituencies in Clwyd
 List of parliamentary constituencies in Wales

References

External links 
Politics Resources (Election results from 1922 onwards)
Electoral Calculus (Election results from 1955 onwards)
2017 Election House Of Commons Library 2017 Election report
A Vision Of Britain Through Time (Constituency elector numbers)

Parliamentary constituencies in North Wales
Constituencies of the Parliament of the United Kingdom established in 1997